The 1950 San Francisco State Gators football team represented San Francisco State College—now known as San Francisco State University—as a member of the Far Western Conference (FWC) during the 1950 college football season. Led by first-year head coach Joe Verducci, San Francisco State compiled an overall record of 6–2 with a mark of 4–0 in conference play, winning the FWC title, the program's first conference championship. As champion of the FWC, the Gators qualified for the fifth annual Pear Bowl in Medford, Oregon. For the season the team outscored by its opponents 260 to 180. The Gators played home games at Cox Stadium in San Francisco.

Schedule

References

San Francisco State
San Francisco State Gators football seasons
Northern California Athletic Conference football champion seasons
San Francisco State Gators football